Hirini Rawiri Taiwhanga ( 1832 – 27 November 1890), known as Sydney Taiwhanga, was a 19th-century Māori member of the House of Representatives.

Taiwhanga identified with the Ngāpuhi iwi. He was born in Kaikohe, Northland, New Zealand in about 1832; his father was Rawiri Taiwhanga.

Of eight candidates, he came last with 5.5% of the vote. In the Western Maori , he came fourth out of five candidates.

He represented the Northern Maori electorate from 1887 to 1890 when he died, aged about 55.

He was re-elected in 1890 for Northern Maori, but died on election day. He also stood in Eastern Maori, and came second.

A by-election was held in the Northern Maori electorate on 7 February 1891 to replace him.

References

1830s births
1890 deaths
New Zealand MPs for Māori electorates
Members of the New Zealand House of Representatives
Ngāpuhi people
Unsuccessful candidates in the 1884 New Zealand general election
19th-century New Zealand politicians